Condor (formerly El Condor) is a steel suspended roller coaster located at Walibi Holland in the Netherlands. The ride opened in 1994 as the first of many Suspended Looping Coasters (SLC) manufactured by Dutch company Vekoma.

In 2014 the ride track was repainted orange, track correction was done and the name was changed to Condor instead of “El Condor”. The old name still persists on some in-park signage.

For the 2021 season, Condor received 2 new trains from Vekoma with the improved vest restraints to improve comfort. The ride’s location, “Exotic” also gained a makeover. 

Roller coasters introduced in 1994
Articles containing video clips
Roller coasters in the Netherlands